Altanochir (1882–1949) was an Inner Mongolian prince, politician, and general under the Republic of China and Mengjiang governments. He served as deputy head of Yeke-juu League (today Ordos City). An ethnic Mongol, he was a native of Right-Wing Rear Banner, Ordos (today administered as Hanggin Banner, Ordos City).

Names
His Mongolian name may be spelled two different ways, with a variety of transcriptions of his Mongolian name into Chinese characters:
Altanochir or Altan Ochir, his Mongolian name
Altanvachir or Altan Vachir, an earlier transcription of his Mongolian name
For short, he was sometimes referred to as Prince A or A Wang (from Chinese 阿王).

Career
Altanochir was appointed as the deputy head of Yeke-juu League in 1919. He was also a soldier in the Republic of China's National Revolutionary Army; in 1928 he became deputy commander (副司令) for the Baotou region. In March 1934, he was appointed a member of the Nanjing government's newly established Mongolian Local Autonomous Political Committee. He sided with Prince Pandegunchab of Dörbed Banner, Ulanqab League in opposing the Mongol autonomy movement. He was promoted to the rank of lieutenant general in 1937.

However, he would join the pro-Japanese Mongol United Autonomous Government after its establishment in 1937. He took up the position of deputy head of Yeke-juu league under that government as well in February 1938. Previously a close friend of local warlord Fu Zuoyi, he asked Prince Demchugdongrub to send troops to help him break out of the control of Fu Zuoyi and join Demchugdongrub's autonomy movement. Overlooking Altanochir's former friendship with the warlord and his questionable loyalty to the Mongol autonomy movement, Demchugdongrub agreed to send one cavalry brigade in the spring of 1938 to assist him. After the formation of the Mengjiang United Autonomous Government in October 1939, Altanochir became a member of the Mongol Revival Committee (興蒙委員會) and general commander of the Ordos Army (鄂爾多斯挺進軍). In 1947 after the war had ended, he returned to his position as deputy head of Yeke-juu league. In early 1949 he was named a member of the Mongol Autonomous Preparatory Committee (蒙古自治籌備委員會) at Dingyuanying (定遠營; today Bayan Hot, Alxa League); he died there on 16 April 1949.

References

Bibliography

External links
Profile on generals.dk

1882 births
1949 deaths
Republic of China politicians from Inner Mongolia
Mengjiang
National Revolutionary Army generals from Inner Mongolia
People from Ordos City
Mongol collaborators with Imperial Japan